Maurice Scully (1952 – 5 March 2023) was an Irish poet who worked in the modernist tradition. Scully was born in Dublin and educated at Trinity College. He was a member of Aosdana.

Life
After some years living in Italy, Africa and the west of Ireland, he settled with his wife and four children in Dublin.

Scully died in Bolea, Spain on 5 March 2023.

The Beau
The Beau was an annual literary journal edited by Scully. It ran to three issues: 1981, 1982/83 and 1983/84. Although the journal was short-lived, its contributor list, featuring writers from  Ireland, Britain and the United States, was impressive and it played an important role in the emergence of a number of experimental Irish poets. It also carried reproductions by a number of Irish artists.

Contributors included Roy Fisher, Knute Skinner, William Oxley, Randolph Healy, Brian Coffey, David Wright, Paul Durcan, John Freeman, John Jordan, Anthony Cronin, Gavin Ewart, Eoghan Ó Tuairisc, George Barker, Dermot Bolger and Jim Burns.

The featured painters were Michael Mulcahy, Patrick Hall, Alice Hanratty and Patrick Pye.

Published works
 Love Poems & Others (1981)
 5 Freedoms of Movement (1987 & 2000)
 Steps (1998)
 Livelihood (2004)
 Sonata, (2006)
 Tig (2006)
 Doing the Same in English (2008)
 Humming (2009)
 A Tour of the Lattice (2011)
 Rain (2013)
 Several Dances (2014)
 Game On [with Jordi Valls Pozo] (2019)
 Play Book (2019)
 Things That Happen (2020)

 A book of essays on Scully's poetry A Line of Tiny Zeros in the Fabric [Ed Kenneth Keating] appeared 2020

References

External links
Author Page
'Rain', echapbook online at Smithereens Press
Review of 'The Basic Colours'
Review of 'Humming'
Review of 'Several Dances'

1952 births
2023 deaths
Irish poets
Irish modernist poets
People from County Dublin
Aosdána members